Davis College is a private for-profit college in Toledo, Ohio. It was formerly known as Davis Business College and Toledo Business College.

In July 2019, the college announced it would be moving its campus.

References

External links
Official website

Private universities and colleges in Ohio
Two-year colleges in the United States
Education in Toledo, Ohio
Educational institutions established in 1858
1858 establishments in Ohio